Lisbon Agreement may refer to:

 Lisbon Agreement for the Protection of Appellations of Origin and their International Registration (1958)
 Lisbon Agreement (1980), an agreement between Britain and Spain relating to Gibraltar
 Lisbon Agreement (1992), a peace plan proposed during the buildup to the Bosnian War

See also
 Treaty of Lisbon (disambiguation)